Roy King may refer to:

Roy King (artist) (1903–1986), American sculptor, painter and civil engineer.
Roy Crimmins (1929–2014), English jazz trombonist, composer and arranger who used the pseudonym Roy King

See also
Don Roy King (born 1947), American television director
Elwyn Roy King (1894–1941), fighter ace in the Australian Flying Corps during World War I